Jargalyn Tsatsral (born 22 June 1987) is a Mongolian international footballer. He made his first appearance for the Mongolia national football team in 2011.

References

1987 births
Mongolian footballers
Mongolia international footballers
Khoromkhon players
Living people
Association football forwards